Andabad or And Abad may refer to:
 Andabad-e Olya
 Andabad-e Sofla